IBM Fujisawa—located in Fujisawa, Kanagawa, Japan—was a manufacturing and development site of IBM Japan, Ltd., a subsidiary of IBM Corporation.

Fujisawa manufacturing
IBM Fujisawa was established in 1967. As a manufacturing plant, it produced the following products:
Tabulating machine
IBM 1440 computer
IBM System/360 Model 40 computer
2701 and other communications controllers
In 1971, manufacturing of System/360, System/370 and IBM 4300 mainframes moved to the newly opened IBM Yasu in Yasu, Shiga,。
IBM Personal System/55
IBM ThinkPad
Harddisk

In December, 2002, as Hitachi Ltd. bought IBM's hard disk division, IBM Fujisawa became the headquarters and the main plant of Hitachi Global Storage Technology.

Fujisawa development
In 1972, the Fujisawa development lab was established in a new building inside the Fujisawa site. It developed the following hardware and software products:

For worldwide
IBM 3767 - Printer terminal under Systems Network Architecture (1974)
IBM 3276 - IBM 3270 remote display-controller (1975)
IBM 3101 - ASCII display terminal (1979)

For Japan and Asia/Pacific
IBM Kanji System and DBCS solutions to IBM Korea & Taiwan
IBM 5550 (by the independent business unit absorbed later to development)
IBM JX (by the independent business unit absorbed later to development)

In 1985, the development lab moved to a new site in Yamato, Kanagawa and was called IBM Yamato development laboratory.

Access
 Fifteen minutes' walk or five minutes' bus ride from Shōnandai Station on Odakyū Enoshima Line

See also
 IBM
 IBM Japan (:ja:日本IBM)
 IBM Yamato Facility
 IBM Yasu (:ja:日本IBM野洲事業所)

References

IBM facilities
Buildings and structures in Fujisawa, Kanagawa